The women's discus throw at the 2010 European Athletics Championships was held at the Estadi Olímpic Lluís Companys on 27 and 28 July.

Medalists

Records

Schedule

Results

Qualification

Qualification: Qualification Performance 60.00 (Q) or at least 12 best performers advance to the final

Final

References
 Qualification Results
 Final Results

Discus throw
Discus throw at the European Athletics Championships
2010 in women's athletics